The 2015 Auto GP Series was the sixth year of Auto GP, and the sixteenth season of the former Euroseries 3000. The championship began on 2 May at the Hungaroring and was scheduled to finish after six double-header rounds at the Circuit de Barcelona-Catalunya, on 4 October.

To guarantee a field of at least 18 cars each race, the Auto GP Organisation, led by Enzo Coloni, announced a cooperation deal with ISRA, the Dutch company led by Henk de Jong that organised the 2014 Formula Acceleration 1 season. However, the partnership between the Auto GP Organisation and ISRA was discontinued as Auto GP prepared for round one, due to ISRA's apparent lack of commitment. It was also announced that the 2015 Auto GP champion will be given a Formula One test. This attempt to extend the season did not succeed however. On 26 June, the day before the third meeting at Paul Ricard, the season was postponed because of a lack of grid numbers.

In October 2015, the season was "archived" after four of the scheduled six events had been cancelled due to a lack of entries. Antônio Pizzonia had been leading the drivers' championship by eleven points, after winning two of the first four races. Second place was held by Facu Regalia, who won the season-opening race at Silverstone, while the only other race-winner Luís Sá Silva, was lying third in the championship, another 15 points in arrears. With the victories of Pizzonia and Sá Silva, Zele Racing held the lead of the teams' championship with 132 points, 37 points ahead of the second-placed team, FMS Racing. However, due to the series cancellation, no championship titles were awarded.

Teams and drivers

Race calendar and results
The latest draft for the 2015 season was released on 22 December 2014. On 1 April 2015 it was announced that the Marrakech round had been cancelled.

Championship standings

Drivers' championship

Points were awarded as follows:

Teams' championship

References

External links
 

Auto GP
Auto GP
Auto GP